Father-in-law is a kinship relationship as a result of marriage.

Father-in-law may also refer to:

"Father-in-Law", an episode of Yes, Dear
Father-in-law of Europe, either Christian IX of Denmark or Nicholas I of Montenegro

See also
In-law (disambiguation)